Colin Kroll (May 1984 –  December 16, 2018) was an American entrepreneur who co-founded the video hosting service Vine and the trivia game app HQ Trivia.

Early life and education 
Born in Rye, New York in 1984, Kroll was the son of Alan Kroll.

After his parents' divorce when he was 10, Kroll was raised in the suburbs of Detroit, Michigan, dropping out of community college to work on coding projects for local businesses.

Kroll eventually returned to school, attending Oakland University where he studied computer science.

Career 
Kroll worked as an engineering manager at Right Media, a subsidiary of Yahoo!, from 2007 to 2009 and as chief technology officer at Jetsetter from 2009 to 2013. He met Rus Yusupov and Dom Hofmann while working at Jetsetter. Hofmann, Kroll and Yusupov founded the video hosting service Vine. Kroll worked as general manager of Vine through 2014. Vine was acquired by Twitter in 2012 (though was shut down 4 years later). After working at Twitter following the acquisition, Kroll was dismissed following "bad management" and extensive allegations of workplace sexual harassment of women. Kroll and his business partner Yusupov formed Intermedia Labs, the company behind HQ Trivia. The real-time trivia game app was launched in 2017, climbing to the top of Apple's free game app chart during the early months of 2018. Kroll and another board member forced Yusupov, who was the CEO of Intermedia Labs, out of his position and Kroll took over as CEO in September 2018.

Death 
Police were called to Kroll's apartment in SoHo, Manhattan shortly after midnight on December 16, 2018, when his girlfriend became concerned after making multiple unsuccessful attempts to contact him by phone throughout the previous day. Kroll was found dead in his bedroom of a drug overdose. Drugs found in his system include fentanyl, 4-Fluoroisobutyrfentanyl, heroin and cocaine, the New York City medical examiner said, ultimately determining Kroll's cause of death to be "accidental overdose by fentanyl-laced heroin."

References

1984 births
2018 deaths
21st-century American businesspeople
Accidental deaths in New York (state)
American technology company founders
Businesspeople from Michigan
Businesspeople from New York (state)
Businesspeople from New York City
Deaths by heroin overdose in New York (state)
Drug-related deaths in New York City
Oakland University alumni
People from Rye, New York
People from SoHo, Manhattan
Twitter, Inc. people